The Zimbabwe cricket team toured Pakistan in October and November 2020 to play three One Day International (ODI) and three Twenty20 International (T20I) matches. All of the matches were played behind closed doors at the Rawalpindi Cricket Stadium. The ODI series formed part of the inaugural 2020–2023 ICC Cricket World Cup Super League. Pakistan's Babar Azam captained the team for the first time in ODI cricket.

In the second ODI, Aleem Dar of Pakistan stood in his 210th ODI match as an on-field umpire, surpassing South African Rudi Koertzen's record of officiating in the most ODI matches. In the second T20I, Ahsan Raza of Pakistan stood in his 50th T20I match as an on-field umpire, becoming the first umpire to  reach the milestone in T20I cricket.

Pakistan won the first two ODI matches to take an unassailable lead in the series. The third match was tied, with Zimbabwe winning the Super Over. It was Zimbabwe's first win in an ODI in Pakistan since November 1998. Pakistan also won the first two T20I matches to win the series. They also won the third T20I by eight wickets to take the series 3–0. Zimbabwe's Elton Chigumbura retired from international cricket following the conclusion of the tour.

Background
In August 2020, the Pakistan Cricket Board (PCB) announced that the tour was still going ahead as planned, and were preparing a bio-secure environment, due to the COVID-19 pandemic. Initially, the PCB were considering to host both the T20I and ODI series at a single venue in Lahore. However, in September 2020, it was announced that the T20I and ODI series would be held in Rawalpindi and Multan respectively. On 9 October 2020, the PCB moved the matches from Multan to Lahore, following a disagreement with the government in the city over finances. Multan last hosted international matches in April 2008, when Bangladesh played at the venue.

On 11 October 2020, the PCB confirmed the itinerary for the series, with the ODI matches taking place in Rawalpindi, and the T20I matches taking place in Lahore. Smog had been forecast in Lahore during November, with the PCB monitoring the situation. On 23 October 2020, the PCB made a further change to the tour, moving all the T20I matches from Lahore to Rawalpindi, because of the concerns about the smog.

In September 2020, Zimbabwe Cricket stated that the official confirmation of travelling to Pakistan was imminent. Tavengwa Mukuhlani, chairman of Zimbabwe Cricket, said he was "hopeful" that the tour would go ahead. On 20 September 2020, Zimbabwe named a preliminary squad of 25 players to begin training ahead of the tour. On 23 September 2020, Zimbabwe Cricket received government permission to travel to Pakistan. On 19 October 2020, the Zimbabwe team departed from the Robert Gabriel Mugabe International Airport, arriving in Pakistan early the next day. The Zimbabwean head coach Lalchand Rajput did not travel with the team, so their bowling coach Douglas Hondo was put in charge of the team. The PCB also confirmed the match officials for the tour on the same day.

Squads

On 19 October 2020, Misbah-ul-Haq, head coach and chief selector of the Pakistan team, named a twenty-two man squad of "probables" for the series. The squad travelled to Lahore to begin COVID-19 testing and training ahead of the ODI matches, with the squads for each format being named later. Pakistan's vice-captain, Shadab Khan, was ruled out of the ODI series, after suffering an injury during a warm-up game. Haider Ali was added to Pakistan's squad for the second ODI. He replaced Haris Sohail, who suffered an injury during the first ODI match. For the third and final ODI, Abdullah Shafique, Zafar Gohar and Mohammad Hasnain were added to the squad, replacing Imad Wasim, Abid Ali and Haris Rauf. However, on the morning of the third ODI, Haris Rauf was re-added to the team, after Faheem Ashraf was suffering from food poisoning.

Ahead of the T20I series, Abid Ali, Haris Sohail and Imam-ul-Haq were released from Pakistan's squad. Shadab Khan was also unavailable for selection for Pakistan's squad for the T20Is, due to his earlier injury which ruled him out of the ODI matches.

ODI series

1st ODI

2nd ODI

3rd ODI

T20I series

1st T20I

2nd T20I

3rd T20I

Notes

References

External links
 Series home at ESPN Cricinfo

2020 in Pakistani cricket
2020 in Zimbabwean cricket
International cricket competitions in 2020–21
Zimbabwean cricket tours of Pakistan